Leroy Martin Giovanni George (born 21 April 1987) is a Dutch footballer who plays as a winger. Aside from the Netherlands, he has played in Turkey, Australia, Azerbaijan, and the United Arab Emirates.

His natural position is as a right forward or right winger, but he has also proven to be useful on the left wing, as a striker and as an attacking midfielder while at FC Utrecht, NEC and the Victory.

Club career

Youth career
Being born in Paramaribo, Suriname and growing up in Amsterdam, George started his youth career at the local clubs DWS, Fortius and ZSGOWMS before being noticed by FC Utrecht.

FC Utrecht

He made his debut for the senior side on 13 April 2007, in an away-match against Sparta Rotterdam, ending 1–1. He replaced Etienne Shew-Atjon in the beginning of the second half, and scored a debut goal in the 68th minute, sealing the draw. He played two more matches this season.

The following year, George had established himself into the starting lineup; he only missed one match because of a suspension, and scored seven times that season. At the end of the season, it was announced that he had signed a contract extension with Utrecht, keeping him in the Domstad until mid-2011, despite of some problems with his agent. The forward started the 2008–09 season well, but because of growing problems with his physical shape, he lost his place in the starting eleven after a couple of weeks. After showing an unmotivated behavior, he was sent back to the reserve squad by manager Willem van Hanegem. A week later his behavior had improved, and he was forgiven and put back on the first team, and since then he played a majority of the games.

After the 2008–09 season, he lost track and almost never played anymore. In the 2009–10 season he only played eight matches, and after the season was over, he was told that he was not needed anymore at the club, and thus put on the transfer list.

NEC
On 20 July 2010, it was published that George had signed a one-year deal with NEC The club put an option in his contract to extend his contract with two more seasons if he lives up to the expectations of the club. In the second round of the 2010–11 Eredivisie season, George was awarded as the best player of the round, after having two assists in an away-match against Willem II. The match ended in a 3–5 victory for NEC.

Qarabağ

On 6 June 2013, George signed a two-year contract with Azerbaijan Premier League side Qarabağ. George made his debut for Qarabağ away to Metalurg Skopje in the UEFA Europa League first qualifying round match on 2 July 2013, coming on as an 84th-minute substitute for fellow debutante Nikoloz Gelashvili.

George already scored twice for Qarabağ in the Europa League – one against Metalurg Skopje (11 July 2013, second leg) and another against Piast Gliwice (25 July 2013, second leg) on away match. George left Qarabağ at the end of his contract in June 2015.

Göztepe
On 8 July 2015, George signed a two-year contract with Göztepe S.K.

Melbourne Victory
Melbourne Victory announced that George had signed a one-year deal with the club on 16 September 2017.

He played a key role in the Victory's championship winning season, scoring 9 goals, and registering a league high 14 assists. 
His successful season saw him crowned as the 2017-18 Victory Medallist with 53 votes.

Baniyas
In July 2018, George signed with UAE First Division League club Baniyas.

Fortuna Sittard
On 26 January 2021, Fortuna Sittard announced that they had signed George for the remainder of the season. George made his debut two days after signing against RKC Waalwijk coming off the bench in a 2–1 win.

De Treffers
On 27 August 2021, he joined De Treffers in the Dutch third tier.

International career
George was called up for the Netherlands under-21 team various times in 2007 and 2008 by national team coach, Foppe de Haan, but only managed to play once.

Having been born in Paramaribo in Suriname, George was eligible to play for the Surinamese national team. He was called up for the Parbo Bier Cup in 2009 with a mixed team of Surinamese and Dutch-Surinamese players.

Career statistics

Club

Honours

Club
Qarabağ
Azerbaijan Premier League (2): 2013–14, 2014–15
 Azerbaijan Cup (1): 2014–15

Melbourne Victory
 A-League Championship: 2017–18

Individual
 Pacific Metal Group Balls of Steel Trophy

References

External links

 Official Leroy George profile on NEC-Nijmegen.nl 
 Voetbal International: Leroy George 
 
 Video about career of Leroy George

1987 births
Living people
Sportspeople from Paramaribo
Association football wingers
Dutch footballers
Netherlands youth international footballers
Surinamese emigrants to the Netherlands
Dutch expatriate footballers
AFC DWS players
FC Utrecht players
NEC Nijmegen players
Qarabağ FK players
Melbourne Victory FC players
Baniyas Club players
Fortuna Sittard players
De Treffers players
Eredivisie players
UAE Pro League players
Azerbaijan Premier League players
Tweede Divisie players
Dutch expatriate sportspeople in Azerbaijan
Dutch expatriate sportspeople in the United Arab Emirates
Dutch expatriate sportspeople in Turkey
Dutch expatriate sportspeople in Australia
Expatriate footballers in Azerbaijan
Expatriate footballers in the United Arab Emirates
Expatriate footballers in Turkey
Expatriate soccer players in Australia